Kae Dam is a district (amphoe) in the east of Maha Sarakham province, northeastern Thailand.

Geography
Neighboring districts are (from the south clockwise): Wapi Pathum and Mueang Maha Sarakham of Maha Sarakham Province, and Si Somdet of Roi Et province.

History
The minor district (king amphoe) was created on 3 January 1977, when the three tambons, Kae Dam, Nong Kung, and Mittraphap were split off from Mueang Maha Sarakham district. It was upgraded to a full district on 1 January 1988.

Administration
The district is divided into five sub-districts (tambons), which are further subdivided into 89 villages (mubans). Kae Dam is a township (thesaban tambon) which covers parts of tambon Kae Dam. There are a further five tambon administrative organizations (TAO).

References

External links
amphoe.com

Kae Dam